Siwan is a town under the administration of Xichuan County, Henan, China. , it administers Qianjin Residential Community and the following 29 villages:
Shangjie Village
Qinjiagou Village
Yuanlinghuai Village
Dahuashan Village
Dujiayao Village
Laozhuang Village
Xiawan Village
Yang'ao Village
Xiajie Village
Qianying Village
Xiying Village
Sunjiatai Village
Sunjiapu Village
Bogeyu Village
Huoxingmiao Village
Gaowan Village
Shangjiagou Village
Danggang Village
Qingliangsi Village
Shuitianyu Village
Chenjiashan Village
Luogang Village
Laomiao Village
Dujiahe Village
Huanglianshu Village
Zhaohe Village
Sanquangou Village
Dayugou Village
Liulingou Village

References 

Towns in Nanyang, Henan
Xichuan County